A number of different formulae, more than a hundred, have been proposed as means of calculating price indexes.  While price index formulae all use price and possibly quantity data, they aggregate these in different ways.  A price index aggregates various combinations of base period prices, later period prices, base period quantities, and later period quantities. Price index numbers are usually defined either in terms of (actual or hypothetical) expenditures (expenditure = price * quantity) or as different weighted averages of price relatives. These tell the relative change of the price in question. Two of the most commonly used price index formulae were defined by German economists and statisticians Étienne Laspeyres and Hermann Paasche, both around 1875 when investigating price changes in Germany.

Laspeyres
Developed in 1871 by Étienne Laspeyres, the formula:

compares the total cost of the same basket of final goods  at the old and new prices.

Paasche
Developed in 1874 by Hermann Paasche, the formula:

compares the total cost of a new basket of goods  at the old and new prices.

Geometric means
The geometric means index:

incorporates quantity information through the share of expenditure in the base period.

Unweighted indices
Unweighted, or "elementary", price indices only compare prices of a single type of good between two periods. They do not make any use of quantities or expenditure weights. They are called "elementary" because they are often used at the lower levels of aggregation for more comprehensive price indices. In such a case, they are not indices but merely an intermediate stage in the calculation of an index. At these lower levels, it is argued that weighting is not necessary since only one type of good is being aggregated. However this implicitly assumes that only one type of the good is available (e.g. only one brand and one package size of frozen peas) and that it has not changed in quality etc between time periods.

Carli
Developed in 1764 by Gian Rinaldo Carli, an Italian economist, this formula is the arithmetic mean of the price relative between a period t and a base period 0.

On 17 August 2012 the BBC Radio 4 program More or Less noted that the Carli index, used in part in the British retail price index, has a built-in bias towards recording inflation even when over successive periods there is no increase in prices overall.

Dutot
In 1738 French economist Nicolas Dutot proposed using an index calculated by dividing the average price in period t by the average price in period 0.

Jevons
In 1863, English economist William Stanley Jevons proposed taking the geometric average of the price relative of period t and base period 0. When used as an elementary aggregate, the Jevons index is considered a constant elasticity of substitution index since it allows for product substitution between time periods.

This is the formula that was used for the old Financial Times stock market index (the predecessor of the FTSE 100 Index). It was inadequate for that purpose. In particular, if the price of any of the constituents were to fall to zero, the whole index would fall to zero. That is an extreme case; in general the formula will understate the total cost of a basket of goods (or of any subset of that basket) unless their prices all change at the same rate. Also, as the index is unweighted, large price changes in selected constituents can transmit to the index to an extent not representing their importance in the average portfolio.

Harmonic mean of price relatives
The harmonic average counterpart to the Carli index.  The index was proposed by Jevons in 1865 and by Coggeshall in 1887.

Carruthers, Sellwood, Ward, Dalén index
Is the geometric mean of the Carli and the harmonic price indexes.  In 1922 Fisher wrote that this and the Jevons were the two best unweighted indexes based on Fisher's test approach to index number theory.

Ratio of harmonic means
The ratio of harmonic means or "Harmonic means" price index is the harmonic average counterpart to the Dutot index.

Bilateral formulae

Marshall-Edgeworth 
The Marshall-Edgeworth index, credited to Marshall (1887) and Edgeworth (1925), is a weighted relative of current period to base period sets of prices. This index uses the arithmetic average of the current and based period quantities for weighting. It is considered a pseudo-superlative formula and is symmetric. The use of the Marshall-Edgeworth index can be problematic in cases such as a comparison of the price level of a large country to a small one.  In such instances, the set of quantities of the large country will overwhelm those of the small one.

Superlative indices 
Superlative indices treat prices and quantities equally across periods. They are symmetrical and provide close approximations of cost of living indices and other theoretical indices used to provide guidelines for constructing price indices.  All superlative indices produce similar results and are generally the favored formulas for calculating price indices.  A superlative index is defined technically as "an index that is exact for a flexible functional form that can provide a second-order approximation to other twice-differentiable functions around the same point."

Fisher 
The change in a Fisher index from one period to the next is the geometric mean of the changes in Laspeyres's and Paasche's indexes between those periods, and these are chained together to make comparisons over many periods:

This is also called Fisher's "ideal" price index.

Törnqvist 

The Törnqvist or Törnqvist-Theil index is the geometric average of the n price relatives of the current to base period prices (for n goods) weighted by the arithmetic average of the value shares for the two periods.

Walsh 
The Walsh price index is the weighted sum of the current period prices divided by the weighted sum of the base period prices with the geometric average of both period quantities serving as the weighting mechanism:

Notes

References
 Export and Import Price Index Manual
 PPI Manual

Price indices
Price indices
Price indices